The Clock Tower may refer to:

Elizabeth Tower, the clock tower of the Palace of Westminster, known as the Clock Tower prior to it being renamed in 2012
Joseph Chamberlain Memorial Clock Tower, a clock tower at the University of Birmingham